The Antim Monastery is located in Bucharest, Romania on Mitropolit Antim Ivireanu Street, no. 29. It was built between 1713 and 1715 by Saint Antim Ivireanu, at that time a Metropolitan Bishop of Wallachia. The buildings were restored by Patriarch Justinian Marina in the 1960s. As of 2005, there are 7 monks living in the Monastery. The monastery also hosts a museum with religious objects and facts about the life of Antim Ivireanu.

The Monastery is connected to the Legionnaires' rebellion and Bucharest pogrom. On January 22, 1941, led by Hieromonk Nicodem Ioniță, the monks of Antim armed themselves and, using explosives, blew up a synagogue on Antim Street. The numerous Jewish inhabitants of the neighborhood hid in terror. Some of the monks involved were graduates of the Cernica Seminary, a Legionary stronghold.

During the communist rule of Nicolae Ceaușescu, the government threatened demolition of the church and many other historic structures in Romania.  A project organized by engineer Eugeniu Iordăchescu moved the church to a different nearby site and saved it in time.

External links

Gallery

References

Monasteries in Bucharest
Romanian Orthodox churches in Bucharest
Historic monuments in Bucharest
1715 establishments in the Ottoman Empire
Religious organizations established in the 1710s
Christian monasteries established in the 18th century